Khlong Phraya is a wildlife sanctuary in southern Thailand, at the boundary of Surat Thani and Krabi Provinces. 

It covers an area of 153.6 km² (95,988 rai) of the districts Plai Phraya, Phrasaeng, and Chai Buri. The terrain is mostly mountainous and covered with dense forests, but also some grassland.

Animals in the area are langurs, muntjac, tapirs and hornbills.

The wildlife preserve was established on 31 October 1980, originally covering 95 km² (59,375 rai) of Krabi Province. On 7 May 1993 it was enlarged by 58.6 km² (36,613 rai) to include parts of Surat Thani Province as well.

References

External links
Forestry department (Thai only)
ASEAN Center of Biodiversity

Wildlife sanctuaries of Thailand
Tenasserim Hills
Geography of Surat Thani province
Geography of Krabi province
Protected areas established in 1980
1980 establishments in Thailand